Sotaquirá is a town and municipality in the Central Boyacá Province, part of the Colombian department of Boyacá. Sotaquirá is a highly rural municipality with 90% of the people living in rural areas and about 50% more cows than inhabitants. The municipality borders Tuta in the east, Paipa in the north, Gámbita, Santander in the west and Cómbita in the south.

History 
Located on the Altiplano Cundiboyacense, Sotaquirá before the Spanish conquest was inhabited by the Muisca organized in their loose Muisca Confederation. Sotaquirá was ruled by the zaque of Hunza, present-day department capital Tunja. Modern Sotaquirá was founded on December 20, 1582 by friar Arturo Cabeza de Vaca.

Etymology 
In the Chibcha language of the Muisca Sotaquirá means "Town of the sovereign".

Economy 
Main economical activities of Sotaquirá are agriculture (barley, beans, potatoes, maize, peas and fruits as peaches, pear, prunes, apples, blackberries, strawberries, curuba, tree tomatoes and feijoa), livestock and dairy farming.

References 

Municipalities of Boyacá Department
Populated places established in 1582
1582 establishments in the Spanish Empire
Muisca Confederation
Muysccubun